Dmitry Arsenyuk (born May 25, 1995) is a Russian professional ice hockey forward. He is currently an unrestricted free agent. He was drafted in the fifth round, 147th overall, by Metallurg Magnitogorsk in the 2012 KHL Junior Draft.

Arsenyuk made his Kontinental Hockey League debut playing with Metallurg Magnitogorsk during the 2014–15 KHL season.

Career statistics

References

External links

1995 births
Living people
Dizel Penza players
Metallurg Magnitogorsk players
Rubin Tyumen players
Russian ice hockey forwards
Stalnye Lisy players
HC Yugra players
Yunost Minsk players
People from Magnitogorsk
Sportspeople from Chelyabinsk Oblast